{|
|}

The BMW 802 was a large air-cooled radial aircraft engine, built using two rows of nine cylinders to produce what was essentially an 18-cylinder version of the 14-cylinder BMW 801. Although promising at first, development dragged on and the project was eventually cancelled to concentrate on jet engines instead.

Design and development
Soon after the 801 entered testing, BMW engineers turned to building much larger versions.

One idea was to bolt two 801s back to back. Although seemingly a simple concept, the resulting, 83.5 litre displacement BMW 803 was in fact fantastically complicated. The power of the engine could only practically be used in extremely large propellers, or, as selected, a contra-rotating pair of propellers. This required a large gearbox on the front of the engine, which combined with the layout of the cylinders, left no room for airflow over the cylinders. This demanded the addition of liquid cooling.

Another idea was to add more cylinders to the 801 design, and since radials need to have an odd number of cylinders per row, the next size up was a two-row 9-cylinder design. The 802 emerged with an almost identical displacement to the American 18-cylinder Wright R-3350 Duplex-Cyclone and just  larger than the British Bristol Centaurus.

One problem with the 801 was its poor altitude performance, due almost entirely to its single-stage two-speed, mechanically driven supercharger. Since the 802 was not a necessity given the success and emerging flexibility of the 801's basic design, the engineers decided to take the time needed to address this problem by including an improved two-stage three-speed supercharger.

In addition, airflow through the engine had been carefully managed by the BMW aviation powerplant engineering team to enable the straightest possible path into and out of the engine. A twelve-blade fan, almost identical in appearance to the 801's, and stator compressed incoming air, then fed some into the supercharger. The rest was channeled into three paths, the intercooler and the front and rear cylinder baffles. All three streams rejoined behind the rearmost row of cylinders into the exhaust. The combination of the fan and ejector thrust from the exhaust balanced the total internal engine drag.

The American Wright Duplex-Cyclone radial engine, however, only weighed 1,212 kg (2,670 lb) for nearly the same displacement and engine configuration as the 802. The 802 was eventually projected to be capable of producing , a power level that the Duplex-Cyclone would not equal and surpass until the post-war years, up to some 2,610 kW (3,500 hp) through the addition of a trio of power-recovery turbines in later models.

Development was still underway in late 1943 when BMW decided the project wasn't worthwhile. With their BMW 003 axial-flow turbojet engine finally maturing and considerably larger models of turbojet and even turboprop powerplants entering the prototype phase from both BMW and their competitors, it appeared that large piston engines weren't worth building. Postwar, the British scientific mission's leader, Sir Roy Fedden, called it "interesting and innovative" and considered it "one of the most interesting piston engines seen in Germany".

A further improvement led to P.8011, which replaced the supercharger with two smaller turbochargers, driving contra-rotating propellers. This raised the takeoff power to about 2,800 PS (2,059 kW), (some report 2,900 PS (2,133 kW)) and dramatically improved altitude performance. As with most German turbocharger projects, the lack of quality high-temperature alloys meant the project was never able to enter production.

Specifications (BMW 802)

See also

References

Notes

Bibliography

1940s aircraft piston engines
Aircraft air-cooled radial piston engines
BMW aircraft engines

Abandoned military aircraft engine projects of Germany